Praxithea is a genus of beetles in the family Cerambycidae, containing the following species:

 Praxithea angusta Lane, 1966
 Praxithea beckeri Martins & Monné, 1980
 Praxithea borgmeieri Lane, 1938
 Praxithea chavantina Lane, 1949
 Praxithea derourei (Chabrillac, 1857)
 Praxithea fabricii (Audinet-Serville, 1834)
 Praxithea guianensis Tavakilian & Monné, 2002
 Praxithea javetii (Chabrillac, 1857)
 Praxithea lanei Joly, 1999
 Praxithea melzeri Lane, 1956
 Praxithea morvanae Tavakilian & Monné, 2002
 Praxithea peruviana Lane, 1966
 Praxithea seabrai Tavakilian & Monné, 2002
 Praxithea thomsonii (Chabrillac, 1857)
 Praxithea thouvenoti Tavakilian & Monné, 2002
 Praxithea travassosi Lane, 1939

References

Torneutini